Kudu ( Kūdū) is a large fast food chain in Saudi Arabia. Kudu was established in 1988 and has 316 locations in Saudi Arabia and Bahrain with more than 5,000 employees. The first branch opened in Riyadh on 16 April 1988 on 30th street. Kudu serves burgers and sandwiches, which are popular with Saudis, but its specialty is sandwiches.

Kudu serves breakfast as well, with some Western-style menu items including waffles.

See also
 List of hamburger restaurants

References

External links 

 Official website 

Restaurants established in 1988
Fast-food chains of Saudi Arabia
Companies based in Riyadh
Fast-food poultry restaurants
Saudi Arabian brands
Hamburger restaurants